30th Anniversary Mari Hamada Live Tour -Special- is a live video by Japanese singer/songwriter Mari Hamada, released on January 7, 2015, by Meldac/Tokuma Japan. Recorded live on April 27, 2014, at the Tokyo International Forum Hall A as the final show of Hamada's 30th anniversary tour, the video was released on DVD and was Hamada's first Blu-ray release. The show features guest guitarist Akira Takasaki of Loudness on Hamada's performance of "Stay Gold".

The video peaked at No. 9 on Oricon's Blu-ray Disc chart and at No. 11 on Oricon's DVD chart.

Track listing

 Tracks 25–31 released as "Disc 2" on DVD version.

Personnel 
 Takashi Masuzaki (Dimension) – guitar
 Yōichi Fujii – guitar
 Tomonori "You" Yamada – bass
 Satoshi "Joe" Miyawaki – drums
 Takanobu Masuda – keyboards
 Masafumi Nakao – keyboards, sound effects
 ERI (Eri Hamada) – backing vocals
 Jang Daehyok – strings
 Junichi Sasaki – strings
 Satoko Nakamura – strings
 Taiga Kanno – strings
 Akira Takasaki – guitar (guest)

Charts

References

External links 
  (Mari Hamada)
 Official website (Tokuma Japan)
 
 

2015 live albums
2015 video albums
Japanese-language live albums
Live video albums
Mari Hamada video albums
Tokuma Shoten albums